Tutaul is a rural locality (a settlement) in Tutaulsky Selsoviet of Tyndinsky District, Amur Oblast, Russia. The population was 396 as of 2018. There are 4 streets. Tutaul is known for having North Korean logging camps.

Geography 
Tutaul is located 820 km east of Tynda (the district's administrative centre) by road.

References 

Rural localities in Tyndinsky District